Xue Song (born 22 January 1994) is a Chinese badminton player who specializes in men's singles.

Career 
In 2002, Xue was sent to train at the badminton school in Jiangsu, and at aged 13, he won the national junior title in singles and doubles event. At the age of 15, he trained in Hong Kong for two years, then he joined the badminton club in Guangdong. In 2011, he was selected to join the national team. He first attracted international attention when he defeated 2010 champion Viktor Axelsen at the 2012 World Junior Championships and went on to reach the final, where he lost to Kento Momota.

He started his senior career at the 2013 Australian Open, and at that tournament, he beat a former world No. 1 Taufik Hidayat, and also a Vietnamese senior player Nguyễn Tiến Minh. In the final, he was defeated by his compatriot Tian Houwei in the rubber game. He also was the runner-up at the New Zealand Open lost to the Japanese player Riichi Takeshita. He won his first international title at the 2014 India Open Grand Prix Gold tournament.

Achievements

World Junior Championships 
Boys' singles

BWF Grand Prix 
The BWF Grand Prix had two levels, the BWF Grand Prix and Grand Prix Gold. It was a series of badminton tournaments sanctioned by the Badminton World Federation (BWF) which was held from 2007 to 2017.

Men's singles

  BWF Grand Prix Gold tournament
  BWF Grand Prix tournament

References

External links 
 

1994 births
Living people
People from Zhenjiang
Badminton players from Jiangsu
Chinese male badminton players